Bremen Township may refer to:

Bremen Township, Cook County, Illinois
Bremen Township, Delaware County, Iowa
Bremen Township, Pine County, Minnesota

Township name disambiguation pages